Bandido is the Spanish word for a male bandit. It may refer to:

Music
 Bandido (supergroup), an American supergroup with Al Hurricane as the lead singer
 Bandido (Azúcar Moreno album), 1990
 Bandido (Miguel Bosé album), 1984
 "Bandido" (Azúcar Moreno song), Spain's entry in the Eurovision Song Contest 1990, performed by Azúcar Moreno
 "Bandido" (Myke Towers and Juhn song)
 "Bandido", a 1959 song from Patricio Manns
 "Bandido", a 2003 song by Ana Bárbara

Other uses
 Bandido (1956 film), a Western starring Robert Mitchum
 Bandido (2004 film), an action film
 Bandido (wrestler), a Mexican professional wrestler

See also
 Bandidos Motorcycle Club
 Bandidos (film), a 1967 Italian spaghetti western film
 Bandit (disambiguation)
 Bandidas, a 2006 film starring Salma Hayek and Penélope Cruz